Sebastian Białecki (born 6 December 2003) is a Polish professional darts player who plays in World Darts Federation (WDF) and Professional Darts Corporation (PDC) events. First Polish medalist in the WDF Europe Cup. He is also a Denmark Open champion, soft-tip Polish Champion and two-time Polish Junior Darts Champion. His other big achievements to date were three tournament victories on the PDC's Challenge and Development Tours, and reaching the quarter-finals in the 2022 UK Open.

Career
Białecki started playing darts in 2015, at the age of 12. The first big success of Białecki was winning the Polish Junior Championship twice in 2017 and 2018. In 2019, he took part in international tournaments for the first time. At the beginning of 2020, he took part in the Q-School qualifying tournament for the PDC Pro Tour card, as well as taking part in PDC Development Tour tournaments in Hildesheim, Germany, where he reached the Last 32 three times, and reached the semi-finals once, losing the match for the final with Ryan Meikle. In September 2020, he took part in 2020 PDC World Youth Championship, advancing from group stage to the second round, where he again lost to Meikle, this time by 0–6.

In 2021, he took part in Q-School again, but was unsuccessful. Good results in the PDC Pro Tour tournaments organized in 2020 allowed Białecki to start in the 2021 UK Open. He was the first player in history to be born after the first edition of this tournament. In the first round of this edition, he faced Jim McEwan, achieved a nine-dart finish, and won the match 6–2. In the following matches of the tournament, he defeated Jitse Van der Wal (who also hit a nine-dart finish against him) and Derk Telnekes. He was eliminated in the fourth round, losing to Mensur Suljović 6–10.

In the next part of the season, he played in the PDC Pro Tour tournaments. In September 2021, he won his first international tournament PDC Challenge Tour in Niedernhausen, beating Kevin Doets 5–4 in the final. Two months later, in November 2021, he won the first PDC Development Tour tournament beating Geert Nentjes 5–4 in the final. In November, he also took part in the 2021 PDC World Youth Championship, unfortunately ending his participation in the group stage after losing all his matches.

In 2022, he had his third attempt at Q-School, but again not successfully. Good results throughout the previous season, paid off with an invitation to the 2022 UK Open. In this tournament, he achieved his best performance, beating successively in his duels Matt Campbell, Joe Murnan, Keegan Brown, Ritchie Edhouse, Ian White and Ryan Searle. He was eliminated from this tournament in the quarter-finals, losing to William O'Connor 9–10, despite having a match dart for a 150 checkout on double 15. After the tournament, he moved up to the 81st place in the Professional Darts Corporation ranking.

In April 2022, he took part in Denmark Open, which his first seniors WDF tournament and won it beating along the way some high-rank players like Ben Hazel, Andy Baetens, Dennis Nilsson, Shaun McDonald and in the final Darren Johnson 6–1. The triumph in this tournament guaranteed him a start in the 2023 WDF World Darts Championship. Next day, he took part in Denmark Masters, but lost in first match. In the same month, he took part in East European qualifying for the PDC European Tour tournaments and successfully qualified for three tournaments played in the next part of the season.

In early May, he played moderately successful at the PDC Development Tour tournaments in Wigan. Only in one of the tournaments he advanced to the Last 8. In his debut on European Tour stage later that month at 2022 Czech Darts Open, he lost 4–6 to Martijn Kleermaker in first round. Similarly at the end of the month, he was eliminated in first round of the 2022 Dutch Darts Championship, where he lost 1–6 to Jelle Klaasen. On 4 June 2022, he won his second PDC Development Tour in Hildesheim, beating Keane Barry 5–3 in the final.

In the middle of the month, he take part in the 2022 PDC World Cup of Darts representing Poland with Krzysztof Ratajski. In first match, Polish players had a problem to beat Danny Baggish and Jules van Dongen from the United States. The last ninth leg ended favorably for the Poles. Białecki scored 180 points, which allowed to set 40 points to the end. Danny Baggish had missed tops for a 160 finish and after that Krzysztof Ratajski end a leg and match with D20, threw a 13-darter leg for a 5–4 win and spot in the second round of this tournament. In the second round he faced Kim Huybrechts and lost that match 2–4 in legs. The loss of Krzysztof Ratajski with Dimitri van den Bergh in first single match meant that the Poles left the tournament after second round.

At the beginning of July, he played at 2022 European Darts Matchplay. During the evening session, he won his first match on PDC European Tour against Mervyn King, beating him 6–4. During the second day of this tournament, he minimally lost 5–6 to Stephen Bunting who finishing 110 in the last leg after Białecki missed a match dart on double 20. The following week he took part in the Polish Championship, where he lost 3–5 to Tytus Kanik in the final match. At the end of the month, he took part in the soft-tip Polish Darts Championship. In the men's singles he beat Łukasz Wacławski, winning the first adult title of the Polish Darts Champion and qualified for the second soft-tip EDF European Darts Championship in his career.

At the end of September 2022, he was selected by the national federation to participate in the 2022 WDF Europe Cup. On the second day of the tournament, he advanced to the finals of the pairs competition where he played together with Dariusz Marciniak. On the way to first medal of this event for Poland, they defeated, among others rivals from Switzerland (Thomas Junghans and Stefan Bellmont) and Wales (Sam Cankett and Nick Kenny). Ultimately, on October 1, they were defeated by the England pairs Joshua Richardson and Scott Williams by 2–6 in legs. On the third day of the tournament, he advanced to the quarter-finals of the singles competition, defeating Liam Meek and James Hurrell on the road to the final phase. In the quarter-finals match, he lost to Danny van Trijp by 2–5 in legs. In the team competition, he did not make it to the final phase.

In November, he participated in the qualifying for the 2023 PDC World Darts Championship for players from Eastern Europe. On his way to the final, he defeated Michele Turetta, Alexander Mašek and Rusty-Jake Rodriguez. In the qualifying final, he faced Christian Gödl and won by 7–4 in legs.

World Championship results

WDF
 2023:

PDC
 2023: First round (lost to Jim Williams 2–3)

Performance timeline

Nine-dart finishes

References

2003 births
Living people
Polish darts players
People from Łódź
Sportspeople from Łódź Voivodeship